Nancy Young Wright was a member of the Arizona House of Representatives from 2009 through 2011. She was elected to the House in November 2008. She ran for re-election in 2010, but was defeated.

References

Democratic Party members of the Arizona House of Representatives
Women state legislators in Arizona
21st-century American politicians
21st-century American women politicians
Living people
Year of birth missing (living people)